Hou Yong (born 1960) is a Chinese filmmaker and cinematographer. He is perhaps best known for his collaboration with director Zhang Yimou, though he has worked with many of China's major directors. Like some of Zhang's other cinematographers (notably Lü Yue, whom Hou replaced), Hou has also moved into the directing world. In 2004, he directed Jasmine Women starring Zhang Ziyi.

Hou began his career after graduating from the Beijing Film Academy in 1982 in the same class as Fifth Generation directors Zhang Yimou, Chen Kaige, and Tian Zhuangzhuang. Hou's early career was spent mainly on Fifth Generation projects, notably those of Tian, and Wu Ziniu. By the late 1990s, Hou began collaborating with Zhang Yimou for a series of films during Zhang's realist period.

Filmography

As cinematographer

As director

As actor
 The Grand Mansion Gate II  大宅门 第二部 (2003 TV series)

Notes

External links
 
 

Chinese cinematographers
Film directors from Shaanxi
Beijing Film Academy alumni
1960 births
Living people
Artists from Xi'an

Chinese film directors